The 2021 Rally Italia Sardegna (also known as the Rally d'Italia Sardegna 2021) was a motor racing event for rally cars that held over four days between 3 and 6 June 2021. It marked the eighteenth running of the Rally Italia Sardegna. The event was the fifth round of the 2021 World Rally Championship, World Rally Championship-2 and World Rally Championship-3. The 2021 event was based in Olbia in Sardinia and contested over twenty special stages totalling  in competitive distance.

Dani Sordo and Carlos del Barrio were the two-time defending rally winners, but del Barrio did not defend his title with Sordo as del Barrio moved to World Rally Championship-3 to co-drive with Fabrizio Zaldívar. Pontus Tidemand and Patrick Barth were the defending winners in the WRC-2 category, but they did not defend their titles neither as they did not participate in the event. Neither did the WRC-3 title defenders Jari Huttunen and Mikko Lukka, who competed for Hyundai Motorsport in the WRC-2 class.

Sébastien Ogier and Julien Ingrassia won the rally. Their team, Toyota Gazoo Racing WRT, were the manufacturer's winners. Jari Huttunen and Mikko Lukka won the World Rally Championship-2 category, while Yohan Rossel and Alexandre Coria won the World Rally Championship-3 category.

Background

Championship standings prior to the event
Reigning World Champions Sébastien Ogier and Julien Ingrassia entered the round with a two-point lead over Elfyn Evans and Scott Martin. Thierry Neuville and Martijn Wydaeghe were third, a further twenty points behind. In the World Rally Championship for Manufacturers, Toyota Gazoo Racing WRT held a thirty-seven-point lead over defending manufacturers' champions Hyundai Shell Mobis WRT, followed by M-Sport Ford WRT.

In the World Rally Championship-2 standings, Andreas Mikkelsen and Ola Fløene held a nine-point lead ahead of Esapekka Lappi and Janne Ferm in the drivers' and co-drivers' standings respectively, with Marco Bulacia Wilkinson and Marcelo Der Ohannesian in third. In the teams' championship, Movisport lead Toksport WRT by fifteen points, with M-Sport Ford WRT in third.

In the World Rally Championship-3 standings, Yohan Rossel led the drivers' championship, while Maciek Szczepaniak led the co-drivers' championship. Second and third in the driver's championship were Kajetan Kajetanowicz and Nicolas Ciamin, while co-driver's championship were Yannick Roche and Alexandre Coria.

Entry list
The following crews entered the rally. The event opened to crews competing in the World Rally Championship, its support categories, the World Rally Championship-2 and World Rally Championship-3, and privateer entries that were not registered to score points in any championship. Twelve entries for the World Rally Championship were received, as were twelve in the World Rally Championship-2 and sixteen in the World Rally Championship-3.

Route

Itinerary
All dates and times are CEST (UTC+2).

Report

World Rally Cars

Classification

Special stages

Championship standings

World Rally Championship-2

Classification

Special stages

Championship standings

World Rally Championship-3

Classification

Special stages

Championship standings

Notes

References

External links
  
 2021 Rally Italia Sardegna at eWRC-results.com
 The official website of the World Rally Championship

Italy
2021 in Italian motorsport
June 2021 sports events in Italy
2021